Yang Guanglong is a Chinese swimmer. He won a bronze medal at the Men's 100 metre Butterfly S8 event at the 2016 Summer Paralympics with 1:01.18.

References

Living people
Swimmers at the 2016 Summer Paralympics
Swimmers at the 2020 Summer Paralympics
Medalists at the 2016 Summer Paralympics
Medalists at the 2020 Summer Paralympics
Paralympic bronze medalists for China
Paralympic swimmers of China
Chinese male butterfly swimmers
Chinese male freestyle swimmers
S8-classified Paralympic swimmers
Medalists at the 2018 Asian Para Games
Year of birth missing (living people)
Paralympic medalists in swimming
21st-century Chinese people